Ordsall (ward) is an electoral ward of Salford, England.  The ward includes Ordsall itself, the Salford Quays redevelopment area and the easternmost part of Salford which adjoins Manchester city centre.

It is represented in Westminster by Rebecca Long-Bailey MP for Salford and Eccles. A profile of the ward conducted by Salford City Council in 2014 recorded a population of 16,725.

Councillors 
The ward is represented by three councillors: Tanya Burch (Lab), Peter Dobbs (Lab), and Ray Mashiter (Lab).

 indicates seat up for re-election.

Elections in 2010s

May 2018

May 2016

May 2015

May 2014

May 2012

May 2011

May 2010

Elections in 2000s

References 

Salford City Council Wards